Hong Seong-hui (July 9, 1969) is a South Korean rhythmic gymnast.

Hong Seong-hui competed for South Korea in the rhythmic gymnastics individual all-around competition at the 1988 Summer Olympics in Seoul. There she was 29th in the preliminary (qualification) round and did not advance to the final.

References

External links 
 Hong Seong-hui at Sports-Reference.com

1969 births
Living people
South Korean rhythmic gymnasts
Gymnasts at the 1988 Summer Olympics
Olympic gymnasts of South Korea